Masham railway station was the terminus of the  to Masham branch line serving the town of Masham in North Yorkshire, England. It was on the eastern side of the River Ure, so as such, was actually in Burton-on-Ure. The line operated between 1875 and 1931 for passenger traffic, but was retained for minimal freight train use until 1963.

History
Masham station opened on the same day as the line did, with services commencing on 9 June 1875. The population at the time of opening was just over 3,600, but the station retained healthy outward traffic in the form of timber and livestock.

In 1901, a narrow gauge railway was built for the purposes of constructing reservoirs in Colsterdale, which meant that a section of railway then went north from the station crossing the river, but it bypassed the town of Masham to the north.

After closure to passengers, the branch was normally worked by a locomotive from Starbeck Shed in Harrogate.

In October 1908, an over laden train ran through the station and across the Melmerby to Masham road (now the A6108) and into the narrow gauge exchange yard just north of the road. The wagons were badly damaged, but there were no injuries or deaths. The driver had lost control on the 1-in-61 gradient into the station's goods yard.

The station was closed to passengers in January 1931, but continued receiving deliveries of small amounts of goods traffic until 1963. The issue of the railway being open just to deliver coal to the stationmasters and fresh water to the crossing keeper's cottages was raised in Parliament by the MP for Darlington at that time.

The station buildings are now private dwellings and the goods shed has since been converted into a cafe and gallery. A blue plaque adorns the side of the good shed commemorating the Leeds Pals, who arrived by train at Masham station in September 1914 and marched up to Colsterdale to begin their training for war.

References

Sources

External links
Masham railway station on a navigable 1947 map

Disused railway stations in North Yorkshire
Railway stations in Great Britain opened in 1875
Railway stations in Great Britain closed in 1963
Former North Eastern Railway (UK) stations